Naga Shaurya (born 22 January 1989) is an Indian actor, producer, and writer who works in Telugu cinema. He made his debut with the 2011 film Cricket, Girls And Beer. He then starred in the National Film Award winning anthology film, Chandamama Kathalu (2014).

Shaurya went onto star in successful films such as Oohalu Gusagusalade (2014), Dikkulu Choodaku Ramayya (2014), Kalyana Vaibhogame (2016), Jyo Achyutananda (2016), Chalo (2018), Oh! Baby (2019), and Ashwathama (2020) and Varudu Kaavalenu (2021) and Lakshya (2021).

Early and personal life
Naga Shaurya was born on 22 January 1989 in Eluru, Andhra Pradesh. He lived for several years in Vijayawada, before moving to Hyderabad to pursue his dream of acting in films. Prior to entering the film industry, he played tennis.

Naga Shaurya married Anusha Shetty in Bangalore on Sunday, 20 November 2022.

Career 
Before he got his first role, he struggled for almost five years. He stated, "Every time I was on the verge of signing a film, something or the other would happen and I was back to square one", and added that he was "disappointed and wanted to go back to my parents". He then saw an advertisement by Vaaraahi Chalana Chitram, who were casting for Srinivas Avasarala's romantic comedy Oohalu Gusagusalade and sent in his portfolio. Although he had no hopes, he was selected for the lead role. While working on Oohalu Gusagualade, he was selected for a role in Chandamama Kathalu which became his first release. An anthology film, it featured Shaurya as part of an ensemble cast, with him having about 20 minute screen time in the film.

Oohalu Gusagusalaade released two months later and became a critical and commercial success. Critics noted that Shaurya "deliver(s) (a) commendable performance" and was "perfect as the boy next door". His third release that year, Dikkulu Choodaku Ramayya, was again a romantic comedy. A triangular love story directed by Trikoti, it was about a son and father falling for the same girl. The Hindu wrote about his performance, "Naga Shaurya proves yet again that he's one of the best among the newer lot of actors. He brings in the required innocence of a teenager and shows his anguish and helplessness in the later portions effectively". Shaurya final release of the year was Lakshmi Raave Maa Intiki alongside Avika Gor. His next release was the 2015 film Jadoogadu under the direction of Yogie opposite Sonarika Bhadoria.

In 2016, he appeared in five films, They are Abbayitho Ammayi, B. V. Nandini Reddy's Kalyana Vaibhogame, G. V. Rama Raju's Oka Manasu, Srinivas Avasarala's Jyo Achyutananda and Nee Jathaleka. Out of which Kalyana Vaibhogame and Jyo Achyutananda were successful. In 2017, Shaurya played an cameo in the film Kathalo Rajakumari.

In 2018, Shaurya appeared in four films. The first release, Chalo was a box office success. His other films that year, namely, Tamil-Telugu bilingual Diya, family entertainer Ammammagarillu and Nartanasala failed at the box office. The Hindu criticized the latter for its approach on gay people.

In 2019, Shaurya's only release was Oh! Baby alongside Samantha Akkineni. The film, which received positive reviews, grossed more than $1 million at the United States box office. His 2020 thriller film, Aswathama, produced by his home banner Ira Creations was a profitable venture.
In 2021 he had two releases, Varudu Kaavalenu and Lakshya. Varudu Kaavalenu had an average run where as Lakshya failed to get the cash registers ringing at the box office. Both the films started streaming on January 7, 2022 via ZEE5 and aha respectively and got immense response and set OTT records in terms of the highest viewing hours.

Filmography

As actor
 All films are in Telugu, unless otherwise noted.

Other crew positions

References

External links 
 

Living people
Telugu male actors
Male actors from Andhra Pradesh
Indian male film actors
21st-century Indian male actors
Male actors in Telugu cinema
People from Eluru
1989 births